Cutting down the nets is a celebratory tradition in basketball wherein a coach or player removes the net from one of the backboards after winning a game. In college basketball in the United States, it is usually done after winning a conference tournament, regional title, or national championship game.

History 

Sports historians believe the tradition of cutting the nets first started in Indiana high school basketball in the 1920s and 1930s. The tradition first came to men's college basketball in 1947, when the NC State Wolfpack won the Southern Conference Championship. Following the tournament win, Wolfpack coach Everett Case had his players hoist him up so he could cut down the net to keep as a souvenir. Case had previously coached in Indiana, where he had cut down the nets on four occasions. The tradition then began to spread to the rest of college basketball.

In the 1980s, NC State coach Jim Valvano was said to have his players practice cutting down the nets in order to mentally condition them to be winners. Valvano's Wolfpack team went on an unlikely run as a 6-seed to win the 1983 NCAA tournament.

In 2008, Werner Co., a ladder manufacturer, began sponsoring the NCAA tournament and providing all the ladders used for cutting down the nets in the tournament.

See also 
 Gatorade shower

References

External links 
 

Basketball culture
Basketball terminology
College basketball in the United States
High school basketball in Indiana